Buga is a surname. Notable people with this surname include:

 Ion Buga (born 1935), Moldovan politician
 Kazimieras Būga (1879–1924), Lithuanian linguist and philologist
 Konstantin Buga (born 1985), German boxer
 Mihai Buga (born 1977), Romanian footballer
 Mircea Buga (born 1968), Moldovan politician
 Mugurel Buga (born 1977), Romanian footballer
 Nataliya Buga (born 1971), Russian alpine skier
 Victor Buga (born 1994), Moldovan footballer

See also
 

Romanian-language surnames